Dear Sebastian is a book published by Hodder Headline Ireland. It takes the form of a collection of letters from notable people in Irish society to a young boy who lost his father to cancer.

The book's editor was Jordan Ferguson from a Glounthaune, County Cork. In March 2008, he was diagnosed with terminal cancer and told he had only months to live. He had one 9-year-old son, Sebastian. Ferguson decided to write a letter to Sebastian with advice to help him when he was growing up. Ferguson then decided also to gather together letters from Irish people - writers, politicians, artists, clergy, sports stars, musicians, and business people - all of whom have succeeded in life. This project ended up becoming the book Dear Sebastian. Ferguson died before completing the book but asked his mother, Christine Horgan, to finish the project in his final days.

The letters which make up the book came from well-known Irish names, including:

 Politician Brian Cowen
 Businessman Tony O'Reilly 
 Irish folk singer, songwriter, and guitarist Christy Moore
 Columnist John Waters
 Television and radio presenter Pat Kenny
 Rugby players Brian O'Driscoll and Ronan O'Gara
 Businessman, barrister, and politician Peter Sutherland
 Business magnate John Magnier
 Politician and 18th Tánaiste Mary Harney
 Singer Daniel O'Donnell
 Professional golfer Christy O'Connor Jnr
 Comedian and television personality Patrick Kielty
 Businessman JP McManus
 Gaelic footballer Seán Óg Ó hAilpín
 Businessman Michael Smurfit
 Television presenter and author Eddie Hobbs
 Irish association football player Shay Given
 Chef and television personality Darina Allen
 Television and radio presenter Gay Byrne
 Businessman and financier Dermot Desmond

Publication
Dear Sebastian

References

2009 non-fiction books
Collections of letters